The Lotus 34 was a British racing car built by Team Lotus for the 1964 Indianapolis 500.

The Type 34 was Lotus' second Champ Car. Based on the earlier Lotus 29, it was a very similar car which differed principally in featuring a four-cam 4195 cc (255ci) DOHC Ford V8 with Hilborn fuel injection, producing , through a ZF 2DS20 gearbox.

At Indianapolis, Jim Clark qualified on the pole, joined by five other similar cars. The Dunlop tyres failed during the race, leading to Clark crashing and the second 34 being parked.

References

Further reading
 Andrew Ferguson, Lotus: The Indianapolis Years (Patrick Stephens, 1996) 

34
American Championship racing cars